for other electoral districts with a similar name, see Victoria (electoral district)

Victoria was a federal electoral district in Alberta, Canada, that was represented in the House of Commons of Canada from 1909 to 1925. This riding was created in 1907, two years after Alberta was created as a province, from parts of Edmonton and Strathcona ridings.

It was abolished in 1924 when it was redistributed into Battle River, Camrose, Vegreville and Wetaskiwin ridings.

Election results

See also 

 List of Canadian federal electoral districts
 Past Canadian electoral districts

External links 
 

Former federal electoral districts of Alberta